Faros is a Greek village on the island of Ikaria, Greece

It may also refer to:
Faros beach, a beach in Larnaca, Cyprus
Faros del Panama, a skyscraper complex currently cancelled in Panama City, Panama
Faros Acropoleos, a former football club in Akropoli, Nicosia, Cyprus
Faros Keratsiniou B.C., a Greek basketball club in Keratsiniou, Piraeus, Greece

See also
Faro (disambiguation)